Perdida is the eighth studio album by American rock band Stone Temple Pilots, released through Rhino on February 7, 2020. It is the band's second album with Jeff Gutt as lead singer and is "an acoustic record largely recorded on vintage instruments." The first single "Fare Thee Well" was released on December 2, 2019.

Critical reception

Perdida received "generally favorable reviews" according to Metacritic. Paste described the album as "the sound of a band stretching beyond its own self-imposed limits to challenge what a so-called 'acoustic album' can be", commenting on its "seamless blend of country, British and Mariachi folk, orchestral pop and soft rock." 

Spin surmised that "this could be the start of a new career path for STP" in a positive review of the album. AllMusic critic Neil Z. Yeung described the album's music as "weathered, weary, and surprisingly beautiful" but "does its best to find hope in the darkness."

Rolling Stone was less enthusiastic about the album, giving it two out of five stars and noted that "unfortunately, by going acoustic—even with a wide palate of instruments like the keyboard, Marxophone, and, of course, flute—Stone Temple Pilots have made an album that's generic."

Track listing

Personnel

Stone Temple Pilots
 Jeff Gutt – lead vocals
 Dean DeLeo – guitars, acoustic guitar, percussion
 Robert DeLeo – bass, keyboards, marxophone, additional guitars, lead vocals on "Years"
 Eric Kretz – drums, percussion

Additional personnel
 Bill Appleberry – keyboards
 Tiffany Brown – backing vocals
 Adrienne 'Aeb' Byrne – flute
 Erin Breene – cello
 JJ Golden – mastering
 Charles Leutwiler – cover photo
 Bruce Nelson – guitar technician 
 Yutong Sharpe – violin
 Joy Simpson – backing vocals
 Chris Speed – saxophone
 Julle Staudhamaer – viola
 Ryan Williams – engineer, mixing
 Rory Wilson – art direction, design

Charts

References

2020 albums
Rhino Records albums
Stone Temple Pilots albums
Soft rock albums by American artists
Folk rock albums by American artists